Mallos is a genus of cribellate araneomorph spiders in the family Dictynidae, and was first described by O. Pickard-Cambridge in 1902. Among the genus, Mallos gregalis is known to be a social spider species, living in groups and signaling each other by vibrating their web.<ref>{{cite journal| last1=Bond| first1=J. E.| last2=Opell| first2=B. D.| year=1997| url=http://core.ecu.edu/biol/bondja/publications/bond_opell1997.pdf| title=Systematics of the spider genera Mallos and Mexitlia (Araneae, Dictynidae)| journal=Zoological Journal of the Linnean Society| volume=119| issue=4| pages=389–445| doi=10.1111/j.1096-3642.1997.tb00141.x| archive-url=https://web.archive.org/web/20160305005514/http://core.ecu.edu/biol/bondja/publications/bond_opell1997.pdf| archive-date=2016-03-05}}</ref>

Species
 it contains sixteen species:Mallos blandus Chamberlin & Gertsch, 1958 – USAMallos bryanti Gertsch, 1946 – USA, MexicoMallos chamberlini Bond & Opell, 1997 – MexicoMallos dugesi (Becker, 1886) – USA, MexicoMallos flavovittatus (Keyserling, 1881) – Venezuela, PeruMallos gertschi Bond & Opell, 1997 – MexicoMallos gregalis (Simon, 1909) – MexicoMallos hesperius (Chamberlin, 1916) – Mexico to ParaguayMallos kraussi Gertsch, 1946 – MexicoMallos macrolirus Bond & Opell, 1997 – MexicoMallos margaretae Gertsch, 1946 – Costa Rica, PanamaMallos mians (Chamberlin, 1919) – USA, MexicoMallos nigrescens (Caporiacco, 1955) – VenezuelaMallos niveus O. Pickard-Cambridge, 1902 (type) – USA, MexicoMallos pallidus (Banks, 1904) – USA, MexicoMallos pearcei'' Chamberlin & Gertsch, 1958 – USA

References

External links
Mallos at BugGuide

Araneomorphae genera
Dictynidae
Spiders of North America
Spiders of South America